is a passenger railway station located in Kawasaki-ku, Kawasaki, Kanagawa Prefecture, Japan, operated by the private railway operator Keikyū.

Lines
Kawasaki-Daishi Station is served by the Keikyū Daishi Line and is located 2.5 kilometers from the terminus of the line at Keikyū Kawasaki Station.

Station layout
The station consists of two opposed side platforms connected by an underpass. There are two exits, one on the south side serving the Keikyū Kawasaki bound platform and one serving the Kojimashinden bound platform on the northeast corner.

Platforms

History
It was renamed Kawasaki-Daishi Station in November 1925.

Keikyū introduced station numbering to its stations on 21 October 2010; Kawasaki-Daishi Station was assigned station number KK22.

Future plans 
There are plans to move the station underground.

Passenger statistics
In fiscal 2019, the station was used by an average of 18,231 passengers daily. 

The passenger figures for previous years are as shown below.

Surrounding area
The station serves the nearby Kawasaki Daishi temple.

See also
 List of railway stations in Japan

References

 Miura, Kazuo. Keikyū　Kakuekiteisha to Kamakura Monogatari. Inban Publishing　(1998).

External links

 Official website 

Railway stations in Kanagawa Prefecture
Railway stations in Japan opened in 1899
Keikyū Daishi Line
Railway stations in Kawasaki, Kanagawa